Poetae Latini Minores ("Minor Latin Poets") may refer to collections of poetry by:

Emil Baehrens
Pieter Burman the Elder
Johann Christian Wernsdorf